Tang-e Karam (also Romanized as Tang-i-Karam) is a village in Kushk-e Qazi Rural District, in the Central District of Fasa County, Fars Province, Iran. At the 2006 census, its population was 2,052, in 495 families.

References 

Populated places in Fasa County